USS Nahma (SP-771), an armed yacht, was built by the Clydebank Engine and SB Co., Glasgow, Scotland in 1897 as a private luxury yacht for Robert Goelet; acquired by the United States Navy on free lease from his son, Robert Walton Goelet on 21 June 1917 for use as a section patrol vessel. It was commissioned into the Navy on 27 August 1917.  Nahma was the sister ship to USS Mayflower, built at the same time on the Clyde for Ogden Goelet, brother of Robert Sr.
 
Soon after fitting out and shakedown by the Navy Nahma reported to Gibraltar to join a group of American vessels based there and serving as convoy escorts. With these ships, she escorted vessels in the Mediterranean, as well as between the UK and Gibraltar until the end of World War I. Following the Armistice she remained in the Mediterranean for relief and quasi-diplomatic work. Operating in the Aegean and Black Seas she carried relief supplies to refugee areas; evacuated American nationals, non-combatants, the sick, and the wounded from civil war torn areas of Russia and Turkey; and provided communications services between ports. She was decommissioned at Greenock, Scotland, on 19 July 1919, and returned to her owner.

Rum running
Nahma was later sold, renamed Istar and registered under the British flag.  During the American Prohibition years she became part of the illicit rum running fleet off the Virginia Capes, bringing Scotch whisky on behalf of Sir Brodrick Hartwell.
 Istar was later converted by Alfred Ehrenreich for use as a shark processing factory ship.  She was scuttled 7 km out of the Durban Harbour, South Africa on March 28, 1931.

References

External links
 
 Photo gallery at Naval Historical Center
 YouTube wreck dive video

Patrol vessels of the United States Navy
World War I patrol vessels of the United States
Ships built on the River Clyde
1897 ships
Individual yachts